The Metro-North Railroad (MNCR) is a commuter railroad system serving two of the five boroughs of New York City (Manhattan and the Bronx), Westchester, Putnam, Dutchess, Rockland, and Orange Counties in New York, as well Fairfield and New Haven Counties in Connecticut. It was established by the Metropolitan Transportation Authority in 1983 to acquire operation of all commuter rail service in New York and Connecticut from Conrail, which itself had been formed in 1976 through the merging of a number of financially troubled railroads, and previously operated commuter railroad service under contract from the MTA.

Station origins

As with many commuter railroad systems of the late-20th Century in the United States, the stations exist along lines that were inherited from other railroads of the 19th and early 20th Centuries. Stations on the east side of the Hudson River were originally part of either New York Central Railroad or New York, New Haven and Hartford Railroad, both of which became part of Penn Central Railroad in 1968 and 1969 respectively. Stations on lines on the west side of the Hudson River were originally part of Erie Railroad which was merged into the Erie Lackawanna Railroad in 1960.

Historical preservation of stations
Dozens of active stations that serve Metro-North are listed on the National Register of Historic Places, the most notable of which is Grand Central Terminal which is also a National Historic Landmark and a New York City Landmark. The majority of protected stations are on the New Haven Line, including two of the three branches. Four of the northern termini of each line contains stations that are on NRHP, but the only one that serves Metro-North trains is Poughkeepsie station. The New Haven Line has been terminating northeast of the historic New Haven Union Station at State Street station since 2002. The Danbury Branch, Waterbury Branch, and Port Jervis Lines stop at platforms just short of former stations that are listed on NRHP.

Other structures related to the railroad are listed on NRHP, but are not stations, such as the Housatonic River, Norwalk River, and Saugatuck River Railroad Bridges.

Station list
This is a list of train stations served by Metro-North Railroad. This includes stations shared with NJTransit, but only those within New York State. Stations are listed in alphabetical order. Stations along the Pascack Valley Line from Hoboken, NJ to Montvale, NJ and along the Main Line and Bergen County Line from Hoboken, NJ to Mahwah, NJ are operated solely by New Jersey Transit.

Former stations
This list only includes stations that were closed by Metro-North after the railroad's formation in 1983. It does not include stations closed by the New York Central Railroad, Penn Central Railroad, New York, New Haven and Hartford Railroad, Erie Railroad, Erie-Lackawanna Railroad, or Conrail, or the MTA pre-1983.

Proposed stations

Divisions no longer in service
 Putnam Division (New York and Putnam Railroad)
 Beacon Division (Beacon Line)
 Upper Harlem Division (New York Central Railroad)

References

 
Metro-North Railroad
Metro-North Railroad
Metro-North Railroad